Tom Hess may refer to:
 Tom Hess (baseball)
 Tom Hess (guitarist)
 Tom Hess (bowler)

See also
 Thomas B. Hess, American art editor and curator